Akim Swedru is one of the constituencies represented in the Parliament of Ghana. It elects one Member of Parliament (MP) by the first past the post system of election.

Boundaries 
The Akim Swedru constituency is located within the Birim South District of the Eastern Region of Ghana.

Members of Parliament

Elections

See also
List of Ghana Parliament constituencies
Birim South District
Akim Swedru

References

Adam Carr's Election Archives
Ghana Home Page

Parliamentary constituencies in the Eastern Region (Ghana)